The Delaware Department of Education (DEDOE) is the state education agency of Delaware. It is headquartered in the John G. Townsend Building in Dover, with auxiliary offices in the John W. Collette Education Resource Center in Dover. Susan Bunting has served as secretary of the Delaware Department of Education since 2017. From 2012 to 2017, Mark Murphy served as Secretary of Education, succeeding Lillian M. Lowery who served as Superintendent from 2009 before resigning to become Superintendent of the Maryland State Department of Education in 2012.

References

External links

Public education in Delaware
State departments of education of the United States
State agencies of Delaware